Sar Taavoneh (also Romanized as Sar Ta‘āvoneh and Sar Ţāveneh; also known as Sar Ţāhū’īyeh) is a village in Derakhtengan Rural District, in the Central District of Kerman County, Kerman Province, Iran. At the 2006 census, its population was 13, in 4 families.

References 

Populated places in Kerman County